Galenidae is a family of crabs, one of three in the superfamily Pilumnoidea. It contains four genera, three of which are monotypic. At present five species have been described in this family.

Genera and species 
Dentoxanthus Stephensen, 1946
Dentoxanthus iranicus (monotypic)
Galene De Haan, 1833
Galene bispinosa (monotypic)
Halimede De Haan, 1835
Halimede fragifer
Halimede octhodes                                                                                           
Parapanope De Man, 1895
Parapanope euagora (monotypic)

References

Further reading 
Ng, Guinot & Davie (2008). Systema Brachyurorum: Part I. An annotated checklist of extant brachyuran crabs of the world. Raffles Bulletin of Zoology Supplement, n. 17, p. 1–286.
De Grave & al. (2009). A Classification of Living and Fossil Genera of Decapod Crustaceans. Raffles Bulletin of Zoology Supplement, n. 21, p. 1-109.

External links 

Pilumnoidea
Decapod families